Igor Kranjec (born 27 September 1972 in Slovenia) is a former Slovenian cyclist.

Major results

1996
1st Stage 4 Tour de Slovénie
1st Stage 6 Okolo Slovenska
1st GP Kranj
1997
2nd Overall Okolo Slovenska
1998
1st  Road race, National Road Championships
1st Raiffeisen Grand Prix
1st Stage 1 GP Kranj
1999
1st Overall GP Kranj
1st Stage 3
1st Raiffeisen Grand Prix
2000
1st  Overall Tour of Yugoslavia
1st Stages 1, 4 & 5
3rd Time trial, National Road Championships
3rd Poreč Trophy 5
3rd Lavanttaler Radsporttage
2001
1st Mountains classification UNIQA Classic
4th Giro d'Oro
2002
5th Stausee Rundfahrt
2006
8th GP Kranj
2007
2nd Beograd-Banja Luka I
3rd Beograd-Banja Luka II
8th Road race, National Road Championships

References

External links

1972 births
Living people
Slovenian male cyclists